Nezhat Nafisi (1920 – 2 January 2003) was an Iranian politician. In 1963 she was one of the first group of women elected to the National Consultative Assembly.

Biography
Born in 1920, Nafisi grew up wanting to be a medical doctor, but was not allowed to complete her education. After her first husband died, she married Ahmad Nafisi, who served as mayor of Tehran from 1961 to 1963. Their daughter Azar became a writer.

Women were granted the right to vote in 1963, and in the parliamentary elections that year, Nafisi was one of six women elected to the National Consultative Assembly. 

She died on 2 January 2003.

References

External links

1920 births
20th-century Iranian women politicians
20th-century Iranian politicians
Members of the 21st Iranian Majlis
2003 deaths